Mozaffari, also rendered as Muzaffari, may refer to:

Places 
 Mozaffari desert, Iranian desert also known as the Polond Desert located within the Mozaffari Protected Area
 Mozaffari Protected Area, protected area in Iran
 Mozaffari-ye Jonubi, Bushehr Province
 Mozaffari-ye Shomali, Bushehr Province
 Mozaffari, Kavar, Fars Province
 Mozaffari, Kharameh, Fars Province
 Muzaffari, Khorrambid, Fars Province
 Mozaffari, Qir and Karzin, Fars Province
 Mozaffari, Khuzestan
 Mozaffari, Kohgiluyeh and Boyer-Ahmad

People 

 Abolghasem Mozaffari (born 1967), Iranian military person and engineer
 Jasmin Mozaffari, Canadian film director and screenwriter
 Nurieh Mozaffari (born 1960), Iranian–Canadian contemporary painter
 Rasoul Mozaffari (born 1994), Iranian professional basketball player
 Saeed Mozaffari (born 1941), Iranian dubbing director and voice actor
 Saeid Mozaffarizadeh (born 1974), Iranian football referee
 Shah Shoja Mozaffari (1333-1382), ruler of the Muzaffarid dynasty
 Sayed Abutalib Mozaffari (born 1966), Afghani poet and writer

Other 

 Iranian vessel Mozaffari, Iranian naval vessel
 Mozaffari (newspaper), Iranian newspaper